In the run up to the 2005 Polish parliamentary election, various organisations carried out opinion polling to gauge voting intention in Poland. Results of such polls are displayed in this article.

Opinion polls

2005

2004

2003

2002

2001

Notes

Poland
2005